Ramuntcho is a 1919 French silent film directed by Jacques de Baroncelli and starring Jacques Roussel, Jeanne Brindeau and Yvonne Annie. It is based on Pierre Loti's 1897 novel of the same title.

Synopsis 
The young Basque smuggler Ramuntcho is engaged to Gracieuse, whose mother formally opposes their union. Ramuntcho leaves to do his military service in Indochina. On his return, decided to leave for America, he discovers that his lover has taken orders. He then plans to remove her but gives up at the last moment when he sees her immersed in her prayers.

Cast
 Jacques Roussel as Ramuntcho  
 Jeanne Brindeau as Dolores  
 Yvonne Annie as Gracieuse  
 René Lorsay

References

Bibliography 
 Dayna Oscherwitz & MaryEllen Higgins. The A to Z of French Cinema. Scarecrow Press, 2009.

External links 
 

1919 films
French silent short films
1910s French-language films
Films directed by Jacques de Baroncelli
Films based on French novels
French black-and-white films
1910s French films